The 2020s is the sixth decade in the industry's history. The industry remains heavily dominated by the actions of Nintendo, Sony, and Microsoft, but it remains unforeseen how their dominance will be affected by cloud gaming and smartphone and tablet market. Virtual reality headsets are expected to become more popular over the course of the decade. The industry was heavily impacted by the COVID-19 pandemic. The ninth generation of video game consoles went on sale, beginning with the Xbox Series X and Series S and the PlayStation 5. Notable games released in the 2020s included The Last of Us Part II, Genshin Impact, Elden Ring and God of War Ragnarök. Game development companies have come under increasing criticism for "crunch" practices, forcing workers to work long hours in the build-up to release.

Consoles of the 2020s

Eighth generation consoles (2012–present)

The eighth generation of video game consoles, including the Nintendo Switch, PlayStation 4 and Xbox One, remain in widespread use. Cloud gaming services like Google Stadia and Amazon Luna are also part of the eighth generation.

Ninth generation consoles (2020–present)

The ninth generation of video game consoles has begun in the 2020s, with the release of the Xbox Series X and Series S and PlayStation 5 in 2020. The ninth generation offers faster computation and graphics processors, support for real-time ray tracing graphics, output for 4K resolution, and in some cases, 8K resolution, with rendering speeds targeting 60 frames per second (fps) or higher. Internally, both console families introduced new internal solid-state drive (SSD) systems to be used as high-throughput memory and storage systems for games to reduce or eliminate loading times and support in-game streaming.

History

Notable video games of the decade

Notable franchises established in the 2020s 

Notes:
 Game franchises that also accompany major film or television franchises.
 Game franchises that are considered spin-offs of previously established franchises.

Highest-grossing games

In popular culture

Film 

Films based on video games in the decade include:
 A trilogy of films (2020, 2022, 2024) based on Sonic the Hedgehog.
Pokémon the Movie: Secrets of the Jungle (2020), based on the Pokémon franchise.
Monster Hunter (2020), based on the Monster Hunter franchise.
Mortal Kombat (2021), based on the Mortal Kombat franchise.
Werewolves Within (2021), based on Werewolves Within, a 2016 multiplayer social-deduction VR game.
Deemo: Memorial Keys (2021), based on the rhythm game Deemo.
Dynasty Warriors (2021), based on the Dynasty Warriors franchise.
Resident Evil: Welcome to Raccoon City (2021), based on the Resident Evil franchise.
Uncharted (2022), based on the Uncharted franchise.
Gran Turismo (2023), based on the Gran Turismo franchise.
The Super Mario Bros. Movie (2023), animated film based on the Super Mario franchise.
Tetris (2023), a biopic will explore the rights battle that surrounded Tetris.

Television 

Television series based on video games in the decade include:

 Arcane (2021), animated series based on League of Legends.
 Cyberpunk: Edgerunners (2022), animated series based on Cyberpunk 2077.
 The Cuphead Show! (2022-present), animated series based on Cuphead.
 Tekken: Bloodline (2022), animated series based on the Tekken series
 The Last of Us (2023-present), live-action series based on The Last of Us.

Hardware timeline 
The following gallery highlights hardware used to predominantly play games throughout the 2020s.

Notes

References

Further reading 

 
 
video games
Video games by decade
2020s decade overviews